Wendy Riss Gatsiounis is a screenwriter, TV writer, and producer. Her play A Darker Purpose was produced by Naked Angels, a theater company in New York, with Fisher Stevens as the star. She later adapted the play for film as The Winner (1996), which starred Vincent D’Onofrio and was directed by Alex Cox. She wrote for The Killing on AMC and Reign on CW. She is currently a writer and executive producer for the second season of the show Genius, about the life of Pablo Picasso, on National Geographic.

In November 2017 in response to #MeToo, Riss Gatsiounis was one of seven women to publicly accuse Dustin Hoffman of sexual misconduct. She accused Hoffman of sexually harassing her in 1991 while trying to pitch her play A Darker Purpose to him. After she repeatedly declined his advances, she was informed he was not interested in her play. She told two friends as well as her manager, who said she'd already heard rumors about Hoffman and told Riss Gatsiounis not to blame herself. Riss Gatsiounis said the incident tormented her for "months and months and months" because Hoffman had been her hero and she was worried she may have ruined her career by crossing him, though she later got her play produced and adapted into a movie.

References 

Year of birth missing (living people)
Living people
American women screenwriters
American television writers
American television producers
American women television producers
American women television writers
21st-century American women